Nina Hrušková-Bělská (5 May 1925 – 30 November 2015) was a Czech chess player who held the FIDE title  of Woman International Master (WIM, 1950). She was a five-time winner of the Czechoslovak Women's Chess Championship (1946, 1948, 1952, 1953, 1956).

Biography
From the end of the 1940s to the end of the 1950s, Hrušková-Bělská was one of the leading Czechoslovakian women's chess players. She twice won Protectorate of Bohemia and Moravia women's chess championships (1943, 1944). She won the Czechoslovak women's chess championships five times: 1946, 1948, 1952, 1953 and 1956. In 1950, Hrušková-Bělská participated at Women's World Chess Championship in Moscow where shared 12th-14th place. In 1952, she participated at Women's World Chess Championship Candidates Tournament in Moscow where ranked 13th place.

Hrušková-Bělská played for Czechoslovakia in the Women's Chess Olympiad:
 In 1957, at first board in the 1st Chess Olympiad (women) in Emmen (+5, =1, -5).

In 1950, she was awarded the FIDE Woman International Master (WIM) title. In 1956, she was awarded FIDE International Arbiter (IA) title. Hrušková-Bělská was the chief arbiter for the Women's World Chess Championships in 1962, 1965, 1969, and for the Women's World Chess Championship Candidates Tournament in 1962.

References

External links

1925 births
2015 deaths
People from Novocherkassk
Czechoslovak female chess players
Czech female chess players
Chess Woman International Masters
Chess Olympiad competitors
Chess arbiters